AgVa Ventilator is a mechanical ventilator developed in collaboration with Indian scientist Diwakar Vaish of A-SET Robotics and Dr. Deepak Agrawal, professor of Neurosurgery at All India Institute of Medical Sciences, Delhi. AgVa is designed to be a cost effective and compact ventilator with the ability to push Oxygen as well as atmospheric air, it also has the ability to control ventilator parameters through an Android application.

Technology 
It has built in Artificial Intelligence and Machine Learning Algorithms which allow the ventilator to compensate for the patient specific respiratory patterns and volumes, which reduces the risk of Ventilator Associated Lung Injury.

The advanced versions of the ventilator have a fixed tablet display with an Android app based interface to control the ventilator which displays breathing curves and lung volumes.

The ventilator can function on an oxygen supply, medical air and atmospheric air, and is also stated to be able to run on portable power supply of 12 Volts, the power requirement of the ventilator is 100 watts. The on-board sensors allow the ventilator to detect distress patterns in the ventilation of the patient and alert the attendant

The ability of the ventilator to run on atmospheric air is stated to also help patients with Neurological injury and deficits requiring permanent ventilation, allowing the patient to be discharged and sent home with the portable ventilator due in part to the low maintenance cost and user friendly interface.

See also 
Diwakar Vaish

Deepak Agrawal

Ventilator

Ventilator associated lung injury (VALI)

Artificial Intelligence in healthcare

External links 
 https://www.agvahealthcare.com/

References 

Mechanical ventilation